Julia Stegner (born 2 November 1984 in Munich, Bavaria, West Germany) is a German model.

Early life 
Stegner, the daughter of Günter Stegner, the Director Central and Eastern Europe for LSI Corporation, and Erika Stegner, an accountant, was raised in an animal-loving household with many dogs alongside her older sister Jeanette, who currently works in film production. For seven years she was a child model, appearing in commercials and children's catalogs, and for nine years was trained in dance.

In high school she discovered a passion for playing basketball, and eventually she joined a club team in Munich. Being 180 cm tall by that time, she was naturally fit for the sport; her classmates even called her "Beanpole" because of her towering height.

Shortly before her 15th birthday, while celebrating Oktoberfest in her hometown, she was discovered by Louisa von Minckwitz of Louisa Models. Tilla Lindig, a Munich and London based couture label first booked her. Although planning to study accounting when she left high school, Stegner moved to Paris to pursue modeling afterwards instead.

Career 
In Paris, she made her first major cover appearance, for Elle magazine. She was eventually signed by Supreme Management and, within four months, she opened the fall 2003 Yves Saint Laurent show. In 2003, she did Strenesse and Sportmax campaigns, among others and appeared on the cover of Vogue (French, Italian, Nippon, and German editions).

By the summer 2004, she had done advertisement work for Celine, Yves Saint Laurent, Dolce & Gabbana, Ralph Lauren, and Dior. She also has been the Hugo Boss house model for several seasons. Stegner has appeared in a 2005 campaign for French fashion house Chloé and shows such as Anna Sui, Shiatzy Chen, Lanvin, Gucci, Versace and Valentino. She walked for Stella McCartney in autumn 2004. She also appeared in the 2005, 2006, 2007, 2008, 2009, 2010, and 2011 Victoria's Secret Fashion Shows.

She also modeled for the 2005 Pirelli Calendar, where she appeared half-nude. Stegner has done print and runway work for the fur industry, wearing fur clothing for American Legend Minks and others.

She has been the face of Aquascutum, Guerlain KissKiss, Hugo Boss Eyewear and the Hugo Boss perfume, and Femme.  In 2008, she became a face of Maybelline and Gianfranco Ferré.  In 2009 she became the new face of Mercedes Benz advertising.

Personal life 
She married the Australian photographer Benny Horne in 2014. They had been dating since 2009. In May 2014, shortly after their wedding, Stegner gave birth to their daughter.

References

External links
Julia Stegner's - official website

Julia's profile at Storm Models
Julia Stegner at Style.com
Julia at Askmen.com
Interview at models.com
Julia Stegner at New York Magazine

1984 births
Living people
German female models
Child models
People from Munich